Pablo Javier Almaguér (born 1971) is an American lawyer from Texas. He is a former chair of the State Bar of Texas Board of Directors.

Biography

Almaguer was the first legal aid lawyer to serve on the State Bar of Texas Board of Directors, and the first attorney from Hidalgo County to be elected to the position of chair.

Almaguer is a graduate of the University of Texas-Pan American, and did his graduate work at Chicago-Kent College of Law. He was previously branch manager of the Edinburg branch of Texas RioGrande Legal Aid; he is a former president of the board of directors for the Texas Civil Rights Project.

Miscellaneous

 Texas Center for Legal Ethics - About Pablo Almaguer
 Pablo J. Almaguer's Linkedin Page
 The Pablo J. Almaguer Public Interest Law Fellowship

References

1971 births
Living people
American lawyers
Chicago-Kent College of Law alumni
University of Texas Rio Grande Valley alumni
20th-century births